Nader Goli Rural District is in the Central District of Baruq County, West Azerbaijan province, Iran. The rural district's constituent villages were a part of Baruq Rural District of Baruq District, Miandoab County. After the National Census of 2016, the district was separated from Miandoab County, elevated to the status of a county and divided into two districts. Baruq Rural District, in the newly created Central District, was split into two rural districts. Nader Goli Rural District was established, with the village of Nader Goli as its capital. The village's population at the census of 2016 was 777 people in 206 households.

References 

Rural Districts of West Azerbaijan Province

Populated places in West Azerbaijan Province

fa:دهستان نادرگلی